Sobrado (San Salvador) is a parish in A Pobra de Trives municipality, Ourense province, Galicia region of north-west Spain. It lies towards the north-east of the province.

As of 2008, the population of Sobrado was 92 (43 males).

Images

References

Parishes in A Pobra de Trives